Petr Hladík (born 16 March 1948) is a Czech former cyclist. He competed in the individual road race at the 1968 Summer Olympics.

References

External links
 

1948 births
Living people
Czech male cyclists
Olympic cyclists of Czechoslovakia
Cyclists at the 1968 Summer Olympics
People from Ústí nad Orlicí
Sportspeople from the Pardubice Region